Dimitri Vasilyevich Kudinov (born 8 February 1963 in Tbilisi) is a retired Georgian professional footballer. He made his professional debut in the Soviet Top League in 1982 for FC Dinamo Tbilisi.

Honours
 Umaglesi Liga champion: 1996, 1997.

References

1963 births
Living people
Footballers from Georgia (country)
Georgia (country) international footballers
Russian Premier League players
Cypriot First Division players
FC Dinamo Tbilisi players
APOEL FC players
FC Zhemchuzhina Sochi players
Expatriate footballers from Georgia (country)
Expatriate footballers in Russia
Expatriate footballers in Cyprus
Association football defenders